Polyscias scopoliae is a species of plant in the family Araliaceae. It is endemic to New Caledonia.

References

Endemic flora of New Caledonia
Vulnerable plants
Taxonomy articles created by Polbot
scopoliae
Taxa named by Henri Ernest Baillon